Professor Abdul Aziz bin Baba is a Malaysian medical doctor, haematologist and academic administrator. He is the Vice-Chancellor (CEO) of the International Medical University (IMU), serving since 1 January 2016.

Career

He attended medical school at the University of Melbourne and graduated in 1979. He joined the Universiti Sains Malaysia in 1986, became Professor in 2000 and was Dean of the School of Medical Sciences 2005–2012.

He joined the International Medical University as a Professor of Medicine in 2013 and became a member of the university's senior management committee as Vice-President with the responsibility for the medical and dental programmes in the same year. He also served as Director of the IMU Centre for Education (ICE) in 2015. In 2016 he succeeded Abu Bakar Suleiman as Vice-Chancellor (previously known as President), i.e. as the university's effective head.

He has been President of the Malaysian Society of Haematology, Chairman of the National Conjoint Board for Postgraduate Medical Programmes, Chairman of Specialist Advisory Committee (Clinical Haematology) of the National Specialist Register and a member of the Malaysian Medical Council.

References

Living people
Malaysian hematologists
Academic staff of the International Medical University
Malaysian people of Malay descent
Year of birth missing (living people)
Place of birth missing (living people)
University of Melbourne alumni
University of Melbourne alumni doctors